Israfil Alam (13 March 1966 – 27 July 2020) was a Bangladesh Awami League politician and a 3-term Jatiya Sangsad member representing the Naogaon-6 constituency.

Career
Alam at one point worked as a meter reader for the Titas Gas Transmission and Distribution Company. He was elected to the parliament from Naogaon-6 in 2008 as a Bangladesh Awami League candidate.

Alam after being elected was accused of supporting labor unrest in Titas Gas Transmission and Distribution Company and trying to establish supremacy of Titas Gas Sramik League, the pro-Awami League labour body of the company. He was the chairman of the parliamentary standing committee on the Labour and Employment Ministry.

He was chairman of board of trustees in Atish Dipankar University of Science and Technology.

Death
Alam died from COVID-19 complications at Square Hospital in Dhaka on 27 July 2020, during the COVID-19 pandemic in Bangladesh.

References

1966 births
2020 deaths
People from Naogaon District
Awami League politicians
9th Jatiya Sangsad members
10th Jatiya Sangsad members
11th Jatiya Sangsad members
Deaths from the COVID-19 pandemic in Bangladesh